Laura Cunningham is a magazine journalist from Dublin, Ireland, previously known for her role in Irish Traditional girl group Trinití. Trinití was signed to Universal Classics and Jazz in 2006 and released their self-titled album later that year.

After the group disbanded in early 2008, Cunningham began writing a syndicated 2 page style/beauty column for The Voice Newspaper Group. She was also a fashion presenter for Ireland AM, TV3's breakfast show and wrote fashion for Glow Magazine. She was also radio fashion correspondent for SPIN 1038 and Dublin's 98. She now serves as an editor for wedding magazine Confetti and recently launched the website Hippenings.com, which sells wedding and party products.

References

External links
 Confetti magazine's official website
 Official Trinití website
 Official UCJ website
 Official TV3 website
 Plan B - Official Spin 103.8 website
 Official Dublin's 98 website

1980s births
Place of birth missing (living people)
SPIN 1038 presenters
Irish women radio presenters
Irish women television presenters
Irish television presenters
Living people
Dublin's 98FM presenters
Ireland AM hosts
21st-century Irish singers
21st-century Irish women singers